George Lyon (born 16 July 1956) is a Scottish Liberal Democrat politician, and a former Member of the European Parliament (MEP) for Scotland.

Lyon is a former farmer from the Isle of Bute, and previous National Farmers Union of Scotland president. From 1999 to 2007 he was the Member of the Scottish Parliament (MSP) for Argyll and Bute, and served as both Chief Whip and Deputy Finance Minister. A member of the Alliance of Liberal Democrats in Europe (ALDE) group whilst in the European Parliament, Lyon was lead spokesperson for ALDE on the Agriculture Committee. Lyon was also vice-chair of the EP's Budget Committee.

References

External links 
 

1956 births
Living people
Scottish farmers
Liberal Democrat MSPs
MEPs for Scotland 2009–2014
Members of the Scottish Parliament 1999–2003
Members of the Scottish Parliament 2003–2007
Liberal Democrats (UK) MEPs